New College of California School of Law was a private, non-profit law school in San Francisco, California.  It was founded in 1973 as a part of the now defunct New College of California, and deemed itself the oldest public interest law school in the United States.  It offered a full-time three-year program and a part-time four-year program. New College of California was investigated for financial aid mismanagement, and financial aid funds were frozen while the investigation took place. While no proof of financial wrongdoing was ever released to the public, the financial aid freeze caused the school to become unable to meet its financial demands. In February 2008, due to the college's inability to meet its payroll, the Western Association of Schools and Colleges withdrew its accreditation of New College of California. As a result, the college folded.  As of April 1, 2008, the law students transferred to John F. Kennedy University School of Law (as did several faculty members,) and New College School of Law ceased to exist.

A number of well-known lawyers and activists taught and studied at the school, including Roberta Achtenberg, Izhak Assouline,  Stephen Bingham, Angela Davis, Peter Gabel, Randolph Daar, and Tom Hayden.

References

External links
 Website for requesting transcripts
 

Educational institutions established in 1973
Law schools in California
Educational institutions disestablished in 2008
Defunct private universities and colleges in California
1973 establishments in California
2008 disestablishments in California
Defunct law schools
Law in the San Francisco Bay Area
Universities and colleges in San Francisco
Law